Dilys Craven  (1919–2008) was an Australian paediatrician.

Craven was born in Wales in 1919, and graduated from the Welsh National School of Medicine in 1942. She served in the Royal Army Medical Corps during World War II. She married David Craven in 1950 and the two emigrated to Australia. She was a specialist in paediatrics at the Adelaide Children's Hospital, beginning in 1951, then held the same position at the Queen Elizabeth Hospital, also in Adelaide, South Australia.

Craven completed her MD at the University of Adelaide in 1966. She served two terms as president of the South Australian Medical Women's Society and was president of the Australian Federation of Medical Women in 1980, and was appointed an Officer of the Order of the British Empire in 1982 "for her services to medicine and paediatrics". Craven retired from medical practice in 1984, but retained her links with area hospitals as Emeritus Physician.

References

1919 births
2008 deaths
University of Adelaide alumni
Welsh emigrants to Australia
Australian Officers of the Order of the British Empire
People from Adelaide
Australian paediatricians
Women pediatricians
Place of birth missing
Royal Army Medical Corps officers
Australian military doctors
British Army personnel of World War II
Australian women scientists
Royal Army Medical Corps soldiers